The Ultimate Fighter 3 was the third season of the mixed martial arts reality television series The Ultimate Fighter. It premiered on April 6, 2006, immediately after the conclusion of Ultimate Fight Night 4. The season featured sixteen fighters (eight light heavyweights and eight middleweights) with still-feuding former champion Tito Ortiz and Ken Shamrock as coaches.  The finale aired on June 24, 2006 and tied the UFC's all-time record with a 2.0 overall rating.

There were several rule changes from the previous Ultimate Fighter seasons. There were to be no team challenges. All fighters would have to win a preliminary match before advancing to the semi-finals—which in practice started the single-elimination tournament at the beginning of the series instead of near the end. The first preliminary match was set by the team who won a coin toss. All subsequent first-round match-ups were set by the team that won the previous match. Each fight was set for two rounds instead of the normal three. If there was a draw after two rounds, the match would go to a final, five-minute tiebreaker round.  In such a case, the judges' final decision on the match would be based solely on the third round (unless the fight was stopped by the referee before the end of the round). Coaches were allowed to bring two other assistant coaches to assist with training, whereas in previous seasons, assistant trainers hired by the UFC worked for both camps!

This series of The Ultimate Fighter was also the first in which fighters who reside outside North America had participated (Michael Bisping, Clitheroe, England; Ross Pointon, Stoke-on-Trent, England).

As a part of their agreement to work as coaches for The Ultimate Fighter 3, Shamrock and Ortiz had a rematch of their UFC 40 fight at UFC 61

A 5 disc DVD set of the entire season, full finale, and auditions was released in stores entitled The Ultimate Fighter 3: The Ultimate Grudge.

Cast

Coaches and Trainers
  Team Ortiz
Tito Ortiz, head coach
Dean Lister, jiu jitsu coach
Saul Soliz, kickboxing coach
Wing Butler, sign language interpreter
  Team Shamrock
Ken Shamrock, head coach
Roman Pollock, boxing coach
Dan Freeman, nutrition/strength coach

Fighters
Middleweights
Team Ortiz: Mike Stine, Kendall Grove, Rory Singer, Danny Abbadi
Team Shamrock: Kalib Starnes, Solomon Hutcherson, Ed Herman, Ross Pointon
Light Heavyweights
Team Ortiz: Matt Hamill, Michael Bisping, Noah Inhofer, Josh Haynes
Team Shamrock: Jesse Forbes, Kristian Rothaermel, Tait Fletcher, Mike Nickels

Host
Dana White

Episodes
Episode 1: Fresh Meat (Original Air Date: 6 April 2006)
Tito Ortiz and Ken Shamrock are introduced as the coaches.
A coin is flipped (red for Ortiz, green for Shamrock) and Ortiz wins, meaning he got to pick the first fighter

Kalib Starnes defeated Mike Stine by KO (punches) at 2:09 of the first round.

Episode 2: The Basketball (Original Air Date: 13 April 2006)
Noah Inhofer defeated Jesse Forbes by submission (armbar) at 2:35 of the first round.
Team Ortiz gains control of the matches.

Episode 3: Team Dagger (Original Air Date: 20 April 2006)
Grove and Solomon Hutcherson befriend each other and declare themselves "Team Dagger," despite being on different teams.  They will try to share information with each other to make sure that they both make it to the finale.
Kendall Grove defeated Ross Pointon by submission (rear naked choke) at 3:45 of the first round.
Team Ortiz retains control of the match-ups.

Episode 4: Hitting it Hard (Original Air Date: 27 April 2006)
Michael Bisping defeated Kristian Rothaermel by TKO (strikes) at 3:51 of the first round.
Team Ortiz retains control of the matches.

Episode 5: The Truce Is Over (Original Air Date: 4 May 2006)
 The fighters watch UFC 57. After Randy Couture makes a retirement announcement, Ed Herman declares he will make it to the finals and win for Couture's honor.
Rory Singer defeated Solomon Hutcherson by KO (head kick and punches) after 0:21 of the second round.
Team Ortiz retains control of the matches.

Episode 6: The Letter (Original Air Date: 11 May 2006)
There is no fight in the episode, although Team Ortiz selects Josh Haynes to fight Tait Fletcher.
Noah Inhofer decides to quit the show and return to Yankton, South Dakota after receiving a letter informing him that his girlfriend back home believes he has cheated on her.  It was never explained how it was possible for him to receive a letter when a strict policy denying all external communication was in place.
A previously eliminated fighter returns to take Inhofer's place, but it is not disclosed during the episode who this fighter is.

Episode 7: Mohawk (Original Air Date: 18 May 2006)
Jesse Forbes returns to Team Shamrock and takes Noah Inhofer's spot in the semifinals.
Josh Haynes defeated Tait Fletcher via split decision after two rounds.
Officially, Team Ortiz retains control of the match-ups. However, as only two middleweights who have not yet fought remain, the next match will be Danny Abbadi vs. Ed Herman.

Episode 8: The Fuse Is Lit (Original Air Date: 25 May 2006)
Ed Herman defeated Danny Abbadi by submission (armbar) at 4:14 of the first round.
Officially, Team Shamrock regains control of the matches. However, as only two light heavyweights who have not yet fought remain, the final first-round match will be Matt Hamill vs. Mike Nickels.

Episode 9 :The Golden Boy (Original Air Date: 1 June 2006)
Matt Hamill defeated Mike Nickels via unanimous decision after two rounds.
Hamill is sent to the hospital after his victory, due to injury.
The way matches are determined appears to be changing, although it is not revealed exactly how.

Episode 10: Full House (Original Air Date: 8 June 2006)
Most of the first-round losers are brought back to live in the house and help train the semifinalists.
White proposes that Ortiz and Shamrock play eight ball billiards (best two out of three games) for a US$10,000 prize. Shamrock wins 2 games to 0.
Despite winning the last match, Matt Hamill is declared out of the competition due to injury. Mike Nickels is not an option to replace Hamill, as he was badly bruised and had a broken nose from his fight with Hamill.
To the surprise of White and both coaches, both Tait Fletcher and Kristian Rothaermel turn down offers to replace Hamill in the semifinals.
Ross Pointon agrees to replace Hamill and fight in the higher 205-pound light heavyweight class despite originally entering the competition as a middleweight.
The semifinal matches are decided by White and the two coaches.  Fighters on the same team are now eligible to face one another.
The middleweight semifinal matches are Grove against Starnes and Ed Herman vs. Rory Singer.
The light heavyweight semifinal matches are Josh Haynes vs. Jesse Forbes and Pointon matched up against Michael Bisping in a battle of the British.
All semi-final matches will be three 5-minute rounds.
Kendall Grove defeated Kalib Starnes by verbal submission (rib injury) at 0:30 of the third round..

Episode 11: The Jungle (Original Air Date: 15 June 2006)
Kalib Starnes returns from the hospital and reveals that his ribs were dislocated during the previous fight.
Singer finds his property defaced and blames Ed Herman and Jesse Forbes. Singer defaces their boxing gloves and lockers and rubs Herman's gloves against his naked buttocks.
In retaliation, Herman hides Singer's boxing gloves and leg guards around the gym and urinates on his headgear.
Singer finds his gear missing and goes outside to confront Herman. They get into an argument and Herman and Forbes reveal that it was Kendall Grove who had been defacing Singer's gear.
Matt Hamill returns from the hospital and is surprised to find out that he is out of the competition due to medical suspension.
Ed Herman defeated Rory Singer by submission (rear naked choke) at 2:31 of the second round.

Episode 12: Bangin' (Original Air Date: 15 June 2006)
Josh Haynes defeated Jesse Forbes via submission (guillotine choke) at 0:18 of the second round.
The fighters (excluding the British) party wildly before the last semifinal fight and the house is trashed.
Michael Bisping defeated Ross Pointon by submission (strikes) with 2:47 left in the first round.

Tournament Bracket

Middleweight Bracket

Light Heavyweight Bracket

* Inhofer decided to quit the show. His semi-finals spot was then replaced by Forbes.

* Hamill was injured after his fight. Pointon stepped up one weight class to replace him.

The Ultimate Fighter 3 Finale

The Ultimate Fighter: Team Ortiz vs. Team Shamrock Finale (also known as The Ultimate Fighter 3 Finale) was a mixed martial arts event held by the Ultimate Fighting Championship (UFC) on June 24, 2006. Featured were the finals from The Ultimate Fighter 3 in both the Middleweight and Light Heavyweight divisions as well as a main event between Kenny Florian and Sam Stout.

This event also marked the debut of future Middleweight Champion Michael Bisping

During the event Randy Couture was inducted into the UFC Hall of Fame and the return of Jens Pulver was announced.

Results

Bonus awards
Fight of the Night: Kendall Grove vs. Ed Herman
Knockout of the Night: Luigi Fioravanti
Submission of the Night: Kenny Florian and Rory Singer

Reported payout

Kenny Florian: $12,000

Michael Bisping: $10,000

Kendall Grove: $10,000

Rory Singer: $10,000

Mike Nickels: $10,000

Matt Hamill: $10,000

Kalib Starnes: $10,000

Keith Jardine: $10,000

Solomon Hutcherson: $5,000

Josh Haynes: $5,000

Ed Herman: $5,000

Ross Pointon: $5,000

Jesse Forbes: $5,000

Danny Abaddi: $5,000

Luigi Fioravanti: $4,000

Sam Stout: $4,000

Wes Combs: $2,000

Wilson Gouveia: $2,000

Disclosed Fighter Payroll: $124,000

Coaches' Fight

UFC 61: Bitter Rivals was held on July 8, 2006 in Las Vegas, Nevada.

Light Heavyweight bout:  Tito Ortiz vs. Ken Shamrock
Tito Ortiz defeated Ken Shamrock via TKO (punches) at 1:18 of the first round.

See also
 Ultimate Fighting Championship
 List of UFC champions
 List of UFC events
 2006 in UFC

References

2006 American television seasons
2006 in mixed martial arts
The Ultimate Fighter episodes